Antonia and Jane is a 1990 comedy film directed by Beeban Kidron and starring Saskia Reeves and Imelda Staunton in the title roles, shown in ScreenPlay on 18 July 1990. It is about two mismatched woman friends who have had a love–hate relationship with each other since childhood.
The story is told in flashback episodes as narrated by the two characters to their counsellor, prior to their annual dinner date.

Cast
 Imelda Staunton as Jane Hartman
 Saskia Reeves as Antonia McGill
 Brenda Bruce as the Therapist
 Bill Nighy as Howard Nash

References

External links

1990 television films
1990 films
1991 films
Films directed by Beeban Kidron
Films scored by Rachel Portman
1991 comedy films
ScreenPlay
1990s English-language films

1990s female buddy films